Blinky Bill the Movie is a 2015 Australian computer-animated adventure comedy film based on the Blinky Bill character, an anthropomorphic koala created by Dorothy Wall for a children's book series in 1933. The film was produced by Flying Bark Productions and partly distributed and co produced by Assemblage Entertainment and Telegael (Ireland).

Plot

In the town of Greenpatch, Australia, a courageous young koala named Blinky Bill (Ryan Kwanten) tells a story about his father, Mr. Bill (Richard Roxburgh) while embarking on a journey across the wild, and dangerous Australian outback in the hope of finding him.

Blinky's dad had created their home of Greenpatch, where every animal could feel safe and live in peace. Blinky has been influenced by the legend of his father, who is on an adventure to the Sea of White Dragons. When Mayor Cranklepot (a goanna) attempts to dominate Greenpatch and become the ruler, Blinky realizes that he must go in search of his father. Throughout his adventure he befriends a girl koala named Nutsy, a lizard named Jacko, and a few other creatures who assist Blinky on his quest. He discovers that being a hero is complicated and requires teamwork.

Voice cast

 Ryan Kwanten as Blinky Bill, a mischievous young koala
 Rufus Sewell as Sir Claude, a British shorthair and the main antagonist
 Toni Collette as Beryl and Cheryl, two emus
 David Wenham as Jacko, a frill-necked lizard
 Deborah Mailman as Mrs. Bill, Blinky's mother
 Richard Roxburgh as Mr. Bill, Blinky's father
 Robin McLeavy as Nutsy, a koala raised in a zoo
 Barry Otto as Mayor Wilberforce Cranklepot, a tyrannical goanna
 Barry Humphries as Walter, a friendly wombat who is friends with Blinky's dad 
 Tin Pang as Jorge, a featherless sulphur crested cockatoo
 Cameron Ralph as Splodge, a kangaroo and Robert, a lyrebird
 Charlotte Rose Hamlyn as Marcia, a mouse is one of Blinky's friends
 Billy Birmingham as Tony and Richard, a pair of kookaburras
 Steve Cooper as Hans, a human who lives in the Roadhouse.
 Tracy Lenon, Ben Wanders, Elif Acehan, and Gabrielle Joosten as the zookeepers, humans who live at the zoo.
 Fin Edquist as Postman Platypus
 Stephanie Mountzouris as bilbies
 Byron Schepen as crocodiles (uncredited)

Reception
On Rotten Tomatoes the film received generally positive reviews, earning a 73% approval rating, based on reviews from 11 critics.

The book Historical Dictionary of Australian and New Zealand Cinema interpreted the Rotten Tomatoes audience score of 43%, taking to imply that audiences and fans of the original book and the 1990s/2000s animated series had negative reactions to the film.

Accolades

Television series

The film was followed by a 26-episode TV series, The Wild Adventures of Blinky Bill that aired on Seven Network in 2016.

References

External links

Blinky Bill: The Movie at Screen Australia

2015 3D films
2015 computer-animated films
2015 animated films
2015 films
Animated adventure films
Animated comedy films
Blinky Bill
Australian animated feature films
Australian buddy films
Australian computer-animated films
Australian children's animated films
Australian children's fantasy films
Australian children's adventure films
Australian children's comedy films
Belgian animated films
2010s Australian animated films
2010s children's adventure films
2010s children's animated films
2010s children's comedy films
2010s children's fantasy films
Films directed by Deane Taylor
Films produced by Jim Ballantine
Films scored by Dale Cornelius
Animated films based on children's books
Animated films about koalas
Animated films based on Australian novels
Films shot in Australia
Films set in the Outback
Films about father–son relationships
Screen Australia films
StudioCanal films
Flying Bark Productions films
Assemblage Entertainment
2015 comedy films
2010s English-language films